The R696 road is a regional road in County Tipperary, Ireland. It travels from the N24 road in Carrick-on-Suir to the N76.

References

Regional roads in the Republic of Ireland
Roads in County Tipperary